London's New Year's Eve festivities have regularly consisted of a midnight fireworks show; the focal point of the festivities are the South Bank, where the chimes of Big Ben at midnight signify the arrival of the new year, and pyrotechnics are launched from barges along the River Thames and from the London Eye observation wheel.

New Year's Eve celebrations were first held in an organised fashion in 1999 to celebrate the arrival of the year 2000. Due to disputes with the city, the New Year's fireworks shows were not held again regularly until New Year's Eve 2004, where Jack Morton Worldwide began to organise the show on behalf of the city of London. Titanium Fireworks are responsible for the pyrotechnics.

Public New Year's Eve festivities in London were suspended during COVID-19 pandemic, being replaced by television-only events due to restrictions or uncertainties surrounding public gatherings. These presentations for New Year's Eve 2021 and 2022 included a fireworks and drone show, held at different London landmarks rather than the South Bank. To discourage public viewing, the locations of the shows were not announced in advance.

History

2000–05
A 20-minute New Year's fireworks display was organised by the Greater London Authority for the first time to celebrate the year 2000. It was produced by Bob Geldof's Ten Alps, and estimated to have been seen in-person by three million people. It was announced that the show would feature an effect at midnight consisting of -tall flames in an "advancing river of fire going upstream at 650 mph" down the Thames (representing the speed of the Earth's rotation), although the "river of fire" effect was  panned by critics and spectators who believed that the result did not resemble what was suggested by the organisers. Geldof believed that the event was successful, and hoped that it would become an annual tradition. In the aftermath of the events, there were reports of overcrowding on the London Underground, and the Metropolitan Police had to pay £3 million in overtime.

The GLA planned to host a second event for New Year's Eve 2001, which would also be organised by Ten Alps, and co-produced by Australian Syd Howard (who worked Sydney New Year's Eve and the 2000 Summer Olympics). Unlike 2000, the main fireworks display would have instead taken place earlier in the evening at 7 p.m., with a smaller display at midnight. However, in November 2000, it was announced that the event had been cancelled due to safety concerns raised by the Underground and London police. Approximately 80,000 revellers gathered around Trafalgar Square to celebrate the New Year, as had been a tradition for many years.

A fireworks show returned for 2003–04 event, with Jack Morton Worldwide becoming producer. Ahead of the 2004–05 event, London Assembly member Bob Neill argued that London's New Year's Eve festivities were not as good as those of Paris or New York City—two of its competitors in bids for the 2012 Summer Olympics—stating that "If we are to be a serious contender for the Olympics we want to be able to show that London can put on a decent show." Out of respect for the 2004 Indian Ocean earthquake and tsunami, a planned light show approaching the fireworks was cancelled and replaced by a moment of silence for victims of the tragedy.

2011–2020

2020–21
On 18 September 2020, Mayor of London Sadiq Khan told LBC that the 2020–21 fireworks at the London Eye had been cancelled due to the COVID-19 pandemic in England, as it would encourage public gatherings discouraged under public health orders and guidance at the time. Khan, as well as the office of the Mayor, stated that an alternative event would be announced. The alternate event was announced as being a television presentation on BBC One, which would feature "highlights" of the past year  Due to Tier 4 restrictions in London and the majority of England, all gatherings were prohibited and everyone was legally obliged to remain in their homes unless they had a "reasonable excuse".

The event was ultimately a fireworks, light, and drone show featuring various locations in London, including The Shard, The O2, Tower Bridge, and Wembley Stadium. The show featured tributes to Captain Tom's charity walk, the National Health Service (NHS), remote teleconferencing, and the Black Lives Matter movement. The finale of the show included an environmental appeal narrated by David Attenborough, while the city also promoted the event as being London's most "environmentally-friendly" New Year's Eve event.

2021–22
In October 2021, Mayor Khan announced that the city would return to hosting an in-person New Year's Eve event for 2022, but that it would be an unspecified event at Trafalgar Square rather than fireworks. Khan cited COVID-19 "uncertainties" as a factor in the decision; a city spokesperson stated that London could not organise the fireworks due to the amount of advance preparation they require, being unable to anticipate what restrictions on events and gatherings (if any) would be in effect by New Year's Eve, and the costs that would be sustained by the city and taxpayers if the event had to be cancelled. Health Secretary Sajid Javid criticised the decision in an interview with LBC, stating that the fireworks helped to provide publicity to the city, and that, "I think there’s a perfectly safe way that it can take place, so I really don’t understand that decision. But that’s not a decision for the Government. It’s the Mayor's firework display, so I hope he can reconsider it."

Details surrounding the ticketed event were revealed in November, including plans for food and live entertainment in Trafalgar Square, and a "live broadcast spectacular" on BBC One which would be simulcast on screens in the Square. However on 20 December 2021, Khan announced that the public event had been cancelled due to the threat of Omicron variant, and a second crowdless fireworks show was held. The show used locations such as Royal Naval College, Greenwich, The Shard, the Millennium Bridge (where Giles Terera delivered a poem by Tomfoolery), and Shakespeare's Globe (where the West End Musical Choir performed songs in a tribute to the theatre industry), and featured the "biggest ever drone display in the UK".

2022–23

On 14 October 2022, Mayor Khan announced that the New Year's Eve fireworks will return to being a public event at the London Eye for the first time in three years, promoting plans for them to be "the best ever". He hinted that the display would feature "three massive surprises"

The theme for the display was "With Love from London" and featured drones at Horse Guards Parade for the countdown and sections of the display. 

The display featured moments from England's Women's Euro 2022 victory, London standing with Ukraine as a result of the Russian invasion of the country, celebrating 50 years of Pride in London and commemorated Queen Elizabeth II who died in 2022 and the Coronation of King Charles III in 2023.

Broadcast
The fireworks are primarily broadcast by BBC One as part of their annual New Year's Eve programme. The BBC also streams the event internationally on YouTube; the 2018-2019 show was filmed and streamed in 360-degree video.

The fireworks are broadcast by other networks as well, including ITV (which presents them during the special bulletin ITV News Including New Year Bongs) and Sky News.

See also
 BBC's New Year's Eve
 London's New Year's Day Parade
 Edinburgh's Hogmanay
 America's Party on The Las Vegas Strip
 New Year's Eve in Copacabana
 Sydney New Year's Eve
 New Year's Eve in Times Square

References

New Year celebrations
Culture in London
Observances in the United Kingdom
Annual events in London